Lawrence Binnie (17 December 1917 – 20 February 1991) was a Scottish professional football player and manager who played in the Football League for Mansfield Town.

Binnie was appointed as the first ever manager of East Stirlingshire in August 1966, but left four months later having won only one of nineteen league matches.

References

1917 births
1991 deaths
Scottish footballers
Association football wing halves
English Football League players
Camelon Juniors F.C. players
Mansfield Town F.C. players
Chesterfield F.C. players
Scottish Junior Football Association players
Scottish football managers
East Stirlingshire F.C. managers
Scottish Football League managers